Kuwait competed at the 1980 Summer Olympics in Moscow, USSR. 56 competitors, all men, took part in 26 events in 7 sports.

Athletics

Men's 100 metres
 Abdul Majeed Al-Mosawi
 Heat — 11.28 (→ did not advance)

Men's 200 metres
 Abdul Majeed Al-Mosawi
 Heat — did not start (→ did not advance)

Men's 800 metres
 Khaled Hussain Mahmoud 
 Heat — 1:54.6 (→ did not advance)

Men's 1,500 metres
Khaled Khalifa Al-Shammari
 Heat — 3:57.6 (→ did not advance)

Men's 400 m Hurdles
 Abdultif Hashem
 Heat — 53.31 (→ did not advance)

Men's Discus Throw
 Najem Najem
 Qualification — 39.26 m (→ did not advance, 17th place)

Men's Hammer Throw
 Khaled Murad Ghaloum
 Qualification — 47.40 m (→ did not advance, 17th place)

Men's Shot Put
 Mohammad Al-Zinkawi
 Qualification — 17.15 m (→ did not advance, 14th place)

Men's Long Jump
 Essa Hashem
 Qualification — no mark (→ no ranking)

Diving

Men's Platform
 Abdullah Mayouf
 Preliminary Round — 326.34 points (→ 23rd place, did not advance)

Fencing

Nine fencers represented Kuwait in 1980.

Men's foil
 Khaled Al-Awadhi
 Kifah Al-Mutawa
 Ahmed Al-Ahmed

Men's team foil
 Ahmed Al-Ahmed, Khaled Al-Awadhi, Ali Al-Khawajah, Kifah Al-Mutawa

Men's épée
 Kazem Hasan
 Mohamed Al-Thuwani
 Osama Al-Khurafi

Men's team épée
 Ebrahim Al-Cattan, Osama Al-Khurafi, Mohamed Al-Thuwani, Kazem Hasan, Kifah Al-Mutawa

Men's sabre
 Ahmed Al-Ahmed
 Ali Al-Khawajah
 Mohamed Eyiad

Football

Men's Team Competition
 Preliminary Round (Group B)
 Defeated    Nigeria (3-1)
 Drew with    Colombia (1-1)
 Drew with    Czechoslovakia (0-0)
 Quarter Finals
 Lost to    Soviet Union (1-2) → Eliminated

Team Roster
 Ahmad al-Trabulsi
 Mahboub Mubarak
 Jamal al-Qabendi
 Waleed al-Mubarak
 Saed al-Houti
 Fathi Marzouq
 Abdulla al-Biloushi
 Jasem Sultan
 Mu'ayed al-Haddad
 Hamad Bouhamad
 Yousef al-Suwayed
 Ahmad Askar
 Humoud al-Shemmari
 Sami al-Hashash
 Faisal al-Daakhjl
 Abdulnabi al-Khaldi

Handball

Men's Team Competition
 Preliminary Round (Group B)
 Lost to Romania (12-32)
 Lost to Soviet Union (11-38)
 Lost to Switzerland (14-32)
 Lost to Yugoslavia (10-44)
 Lost to Algeria (17-30)
 Classification Match
 11th/12th place: Lost to Cuba (23-32) → 12th place

Team Roster
 Faraj Al-Mutairi
 Khalid Shahzadah
 Saleh Najem
 Fawzi al-Shuwairbat
 Jasem al-Deyab
 Ismaeel Shahzadah
 Jasem Al-Qassar
 Majid Al-Khamis
 Abdel Aziz Al-Anjri
 Mond al-Qassar
 Musa'ed Al-Randi
 Khamis Bashir
 Abdullah Al-Qena'i
 Ahmad al-Emran

Judo

Swimming

Men's 100m Freestyle
 Adham Hemdan
 Heats — 53,00 (→ did not advance)

Men's 200m Freestyle
 Adham Hemdan
 Heats — 2.07,51 (→ did not advance)

References

External links
Official Olympic Reports

Nations at the 1980 Summer Olympics
1980
Summer Olympics